Kévin Théophile-Catherine (born 28 October 1989) is a French professional footballer who plays as a defender for SuperSport HNL club Dinamo Zagreb.

Career

Stade Rennais
Théophile-Catherine was born in Saint-Brieuc, Brittany to a Martiniquais father, and a Réunionnais mother of Malbars descent.

Théophile-Catherine spent more than six seasons with Rennes, playing a key role as they won the French Under-18 Cup in 2007 and the National Under-19 trophy a year later.

He made his first team debut against Le Mans in the League Cup and made his first French League appearance in a goalless draw against Lille, both during 2009, while he signed a first professional contract in the same year.

He totalled 120 professional appearances for the club, scoring twice.

Cardiff City
Théophile-Catherine signed for Cardiff City, newly promoted to the Premier League, on a four-year deal on 31 August 2013 for a reported fee of €2.4 million (£2.1 million). He made his debut two weeks later, playing the full 90 minutes in a 1–1 draw against Hull City.

Saint-Étienne
On 18 August 2014, Théophile-Catherine returned to Ligue 1 when he signed for Saint-Étienne on loan until the end of the 2014–15 season with an option to buy.

On 15 June 2015, Saint-Étienne made the deal permanent for three years, for a fee believed to be in the region of €2 million (£1.45 million).

Over his four years at the Stade Geoffroy-Guichard, Théophile-Catherine played 142 games. He scored once, on 2 April 2016 in a 2–0 win at Gazélec Ajaccio.

On 24 September 2017, against his former club Rennes, Théophile-Catherine injured Ismaïla Sarr, and faced a hearing by the Ligue de Football Professionnel for his foul. As he received a yellow card for it in the match, the LFP therefore had no power to issue a suspension.

Dinamo Zagreb
In June 2018, Théophile-Catherine moved to Dinamo Zagreb on a three-year deal. He debuted in the Croatian First Football League on 17 August and scored in a 2–1 home win over Osijek. On 4 October, he was sent off at the end of a 2–0 win at Anderlecht in the UEFA Europa League group stage.

In June 2020, he signed a new three-year deal.

Career statistics

Honours
Rennes
 Coupe Gambardella: 2008

Dinamo Zagreb
 Prva HNL: 2018–19, 2019–20, 2020–21, 2021–22 
 Croatian Cup: 2020–21
 Croatian Super Cup: 2019

References

External links

 
 
 
 
 
 

1989 births
Living people
Sportspeople from Saint-Brieuc
Association football defenders
French footballers
French people of Martiniquais descent
French people of Réunionnais descent
Stade Rennais F.C. players
Cardiff City F.C. players
AS Saint-Étienne players
GNK Dinamo Zagreb players
Ligue 1 players
Premier League players
Croatian Football League players
France youth international footballers
France under-21 international footballers
Expatriate footballers in Wales
Expatriate footballers in Croatia
French expatriate sportspeople in Wales
French expatriate sportspeople in Croatia
French expatriate footballers
Footballers from Brittany
Black French sportspeople